Change in the Air is a 2018 American drama film directed by Dianne Dreyer and starring Mary Beth Hurt, Aidan Quinn, Peter Gerety, M. Emmet Walsh, Rachel Brosnahan, Macy Gray and Olympia Dukakis.

Cast
Mary Beth Hurt as Jo Ann Bayberry
Aidan Quinn as Moody
Rachel Brosnahan as Wren
Peter Gerety as Arnie Bayberry
M. Emmet Walsh as Walter Lemke
Macy Gray as Donna
Olympia Dukakis as Margaret Lemke
Satya Bhabha as Josh

Reception
Tara McNamara of Common Sense Media awarded the film one star out of five.

References

External links
 
 

American drama films
2010s English-language films
2010s American films